Margaret Joy Tibbetts (August 26, 1919 – April 25, 2010) was an American diplomat. A career Foreign Service Officer, she was the United States Ambassador to Norway from 1964 to 1969 under President Lyndon Johnson. She attended Gould Academy, Wheaton College in Massachusetts and her Ph.D. from Bryn Mawr College. She was awarded an honorary degree from Bates College in 1962 and Bowdoin College in 1973.

Early career
Tibbetts was sworn into the Foreign Service in 1949, and her first assignment was in the Political Affairs section of the U.S. embassy in England. One of her major tasks over the next few years was to monitor British policy towards Africa, especially the debate over whether or not to create a Central African Federation. The Federation was formed in 1953, and it consisted of Southern Rhodesia (Zimbabwe), Northern Rhodesia (Zambia), and Nyasaland (Malawi). Tibbetts encouraged the U.S. government to support the British decision, and thus helped facilitate American involvement in the Federation. While serving at the embassy in London, Tibbetts attended a conference in Mozambique, visiting several parts of Africa on her journey. In 1955, the State Department posted her to the consulate in Leopoldville (Kinshasa), in what was then the Belgian Congo (Democratic Republic of Congo). She served for two years, focusing on economic issues. In one noteworthy message, she warned her colleagues back in Washington about the potential for Congolese union leaders such as Patrice Lumumba to play a key role in future nationalist movements. In 1957, Tibbetts returned to the State Department and joined the European Bureau.

Ambassador to Norway
After two years working in the State Department's office of European affairs, in 1959 Tibbetts joined the staff of the International Cooperation Administration and served a two-year stint. Then, in 1961, she was posted at the U.S. embassy in Belgium and labored for three years. After that tenure she was enrolled in the prestigious State Department senior seminar, and it was while she was participating in that seminar that news of her possible appointment as an ambassador became known.

On 28 March 1964 during a press conference at his ranch in Texas, President Lyndon Johnson announced that "We have named, or planned to name, as Ambassador, Miss Margaret Tibbetts, who is a foreign service officer of the first class." He then added that "she has a Ph.D from Bryn Mawr. She was born in Maine." In her diary the next morning Tibbetts mentioned the president's announcement, and also the speculation that she might be posted to Finland. On 28 April Tibbetts, along with two other women diplomats, met with Johnson in the Oval Office. In her diary she described the meeting as "rather fabulous." On 20 July 1964 Johnson notified Tibbetts that she was being nominated as ambassador to Norway. Her hearing before the Senate Foreign Relations committee took place on 28 July and she was soon approved by the entire Senate. On 12 September 1964, Tibbetts again met briefly with Johnson in the Oval Office before her departure for Norway.

Tibbetts arrived in Oslo by ship and took over as ambassador. One of the highlights of her tenure took place in December 1964 when she hosted Martin Luther King and his entourage, as King was receiving the Nobel Peace Prize. While ambassador to Norway she participated in negotiations regarding military bases and atomic weapons. She also helped with the diplomatic arrangements for the visit to Washington by King Olav of Norway. She returned to the United States in 1968, and then served briefly as Deputy Assistant Secretary of State for European Affairs. In 1971 she retired and returned to her home town of Bethel, Maine to take care of her mother. She taught courses at Bowdoin College, and was an active member of the Bethel Historical Society. She also worked to support Gould Academy and the Bethel Public Library. For nearly 40 years she was a well-known figure in Bethel, and could often be seen walking briskly on Paradise Hill. She died in April 2010 at the age of 90.

References

1919 births
2010 deaths
People from Bethel, Maine
Ambassadors of the United States to Norway
Wheaton College (Massachusetts) alumni
Bryn Mawr College alumni
American women ambassadors
United States Foreign Service personnel
21st-century American women